The Park Railway Maltanka (sometimes abbreviated to Maltanka) is a  narrow gauge railway located in Poznań. The line connects Rondo Śródka (Śródka Roundabout) and New Zoo transporting max. 150.000 passengers annually (e.g. 2019 - 138.122 passengers; 2020 - "Covid year" with extremely low result  - 73.502 passengers).

History
The first  narrow gauge railway, called the Harcerska Kolejka Dziecięca in Poznań, was built in 1956 and was operated by Polish Scouting Association (see Children's railway). During construction of Hetmańska Str, part of second road ring of Poznań, the authorities decide to move the railway to a new location where the line would not conflict with main communication arteries. The railway, now renamed Maltanka was re-opened on 21 July 1972 in Malta. Since then it has been operated by Public Transport Company. In 1998 its name was changed to Maltańska Kolej Dziecięca, and again in 2002 to its current name.

The name Maltanka comes from the Knights of Malta, who used to own the land and the old church nearby.

Stops
Maltanka
Ptyś
Balbinka
Przystań (planned)
Zwierzyniec

Rolling stock
steam locomotive Bn2t 11458 "Borsig" built in 1925
steam locomotive Tx26 423 built in 1926
Diesel railcar MBxc1-41 "Ryjek" built in 1932
Diesel locomotive WLs40-100 built in 1956
Diesel locomotive WLs40-1225 built in 1961
Diesel locomotive WLs50-1563 built in 1964
passenger cars (#1, 2, 3, 4) built in 1956
passenger cars (#5 and 8) built in 1972
passenger cars (#6 and 7) built in 2010

References

External links 
 Kolejka Parkowa Maltanka video
 Kolejka Parkowa Maltanka video part 1
 Kolejka Parkowa Maltanka video part 2
 Kolejka Parkowa Maltanka video part 3
 Kolejka Parkowa Maltanka video part 4

Children's railways
Maltanka
600 mm gauge railways in Poland
Tourist attractions in Poznań